The following railroads operate in the U.S. state of Kansas.

Common freight carriers
Blackwell Northern Gateway Railroad (BNG)
Blue Rapids Railway (BRRY)
Boot Hill and Western Railway (BHWY)
BNSF Railway (BNSF)
Cimarron Valley Railroad (CVR)
Colorado Pacific Railroad (CPRR)
Garden City Western Railway (GCW)
Kansas City Southern Railway (KCS)
Kansas City Terminal Railway (KCT)
Kansas and Oklahoma Railroad (KO)
Kaw River Railroad (KAW)
Kyle Railroad (KYLE)
Missouri and Northern Arkansas Railroad (MNA)
South Kansas and Oklahoma Railroad (SKOL)
Operates the Kansas Eastern Railroad (KE)
Union Pacific Railroad (UP)
Operates the Blue Rapids Railway and Wichita Terminal Association
V&S Railway (VSR)
Wichita Union Terminal Railway (WUT)

Passenger carriers

Abilene and Smoky Valley Railroad
Amtrak (AMTK)
Midland Railway
Baldwin City & Southern Railroad (LLG)

Private
New Century AirCenter Railroad

Defunct railroads

During World War II, less popular routes were reclaimed by the war effort for the metal rails, because of a shortage of materials during those years.

Electric
Arkansas Valley Interurban Railway
Hutchinson and Northern Railway (HN)
Joplin–Pittsburg Railway
Kansas City, Kaw Valley Railroad
Kansas City, Kaw Valley and Western Railway (KV&W, KVW)
Kansas City, Lawrence and Topeka Railway
Kansas City-Leavenworth Railway
Kansas City, Leavenworth and Western Railway
Kansas City and Olathe Electric Railway
Kansas City Public Service Company
Kansas and Missouri Railway and Terminal Company
Missouri and Kansas Interurban Railway
Northeast Oklahoma Railroad (NEO)
Southwest Missouri Railroad Company
Union Electric Railway

Not completed
Nebraska, Kansas and Southern Railway

Notes

References

Kansas DOT railroad map (PDF)
Kansas Board of Railroad Commissioners Annual Reports 1883- KGI Online Library, State Library of Kansas

 
 
Kansas
Railroads